The Pope Thunderbird is an American homebuilt biplane designed by Leon Pope.

Design and development
The Pope Thunderbird P-2 is a single engine, conventional landing gear-equipped, open cockpit biplane. The aircraft was designed by Leon Pope of Plymouth, Michigan and made its maiden flight on June 18, 1959.

Specifications

References

Homebuilt aircraft